Manoharam is a 2000 Indian Telugu-language-language action drama film directed by Gunasekhar and produced by Mullapudi Brahmanandam and Sunkara Madhu Murali under the M.R.C & Melody Combines banner. It stars Jagapati Babu, Laya  and music composed by Mani Sharma. The film won four Nandi Awards.

Plot
The film begins at Pakistan where ISI imputes its mission to a malignant mole Basha. He plots and conducts cataclysmic bomb blasts at the most important cities in India. At Hyderabad, Anand a bank employee is been suddenly encountered by cops Govind & Ram Prasad and apprehended as an ISI agent. Afterward, the case is allocated to CBI Officer Srinivasa Murthy who starts his interrogation. Now, Anand moves rearward wherein his nuptial goes down with a plucky village girl Usha. Initially, she scorns her husband and pauses their first night as she yearns to continue her studies. Yet, she is compelled to the wedding. Later, the couple proceeds to Delhi for their honeymoon. Therein, Anand witnesses Basha operating a bomb blast and chases him but he skips. 

Subsequently, Usha slowly understands the virtue of her husband, and love blossoms. After returning, Anand enables Usha to carry on her studies then her honor for him apexes. Alongside, Govind & Ram Prasad seize Basha’s sidekick Mastan and submitted to massive torture. Before his death, he notifies the residential address of his associate Ibrahim neighbor of Anand whose flat number is 6. Here, Govind & Ram Prasad mistake it as 9 and fired on Anand. As of now, to shield their rank they planted proof, forge Anand as a terrorist and the judicial destined him for life. 

During that quandary, Usha remains resolute and combats crime confronting the ignominies. Anyhow, she breaks out the plot behind the scene and catches Ibrahim with backing from Srinivasa Murthy. Accordingly, Anand is acquitted on parole when Govind & Ram Prasad triggers his anger, wherefore he shatters by them. Hence, they mingle with Basha who slaughters them after the accomplishment of his task. At this time, Basha connives to assassinate Prime Minister at a school function. Thus, he envisages using Usha to activate it by nabbing Anand. At last, Anand protects his country by dice with death and he is honored as a true patriot. Finally, the movie ends on a happy note with the couple continuing their delightful martial life.

Cast

Jagapati Babu as Keshineni Anand Babu
Laya as Usha
Chandra Mohan as Usha's father
Prakash Raj as Srinivasa Murthy
Mukesh Rishi as Basha
Mallikarjuna Rao as Anand's neighbour
L. B. Sriram as Anand's neighbor
Jenny as Anand's neighbour
M. S. Narayana as Watchman
Brahmaji as Govind
Surya as Ram Prasad
Jeeva as Mastan
Sameer Hasan as Anand's brother-in-law
Jhansi as Anand's younger sister
Banerjee
Vinod Bala as Ibrahim
Rishi
Siva Satyanarayana
Indu Anand
Master Sagar

Music
The film's score was composed by Mani Sharma. Song lyrics were written by Veturi. The soundtrack was released by Mahathi Audio Company.

Awards
Nandi Awards
Third Best Feature Film -  Bronze - Mullapudi Brahmanandam & Sunkara Madhu Murali
Best Actor - Jagapati Babu
Best Actress - Laya
Best Editor - A. Sreekar Prasad

References

External links

2000 films
2000s Telugu-language films
Indian action drama films
2000 action drama films
Films about terrorism in India
Films directed by Gunasekhar
Films scored by Mani Sharma
Films set in Delhi
Films shot in Delhi